Emmanuel Chabula (born 10 January 1998) is a Zambian footballer who plays as a forward for Lusaka Dynamos and the Zambia national team.

International career
Chabula made his senior international debut on 2 June 2019 in a 4-2 penalty victory (2-2 after regulation) over Malawi, scoring his first senior international goal in the 89th minute of that match.

Career statistics

International

International Goals
Scores and results list Zambia's goal tally first.

Honours

International
Zambia
 COSAFA Cup: 2019

References

External links

1998 births
Living people
Zambian footballers
Zambia international footballers
Association football forwards
Nkwazi F.C. players
Lusaka Dynamos F.C. players
Zambia Super League players
Zambia A' international footballers
2020 African Nations Championship players